Ireneusz Ciurzyński is a Polish sprint canoer who competed in the mid-1980s. He won a bronze medal in the K-4 10000 m at the 1983 ICF Canoe Sprint World Championships in Tampere.

References

Living people
Polish male canoeists
Year of birth missing (living people)
Place of birth missing (living people)
ICF Canoe Sprint World Championships medalists in kayak
20th-century Polish people